Poyfai Malaiporn (also spelled Poifai and Poifhai, born 14 January 1971 in Fao Rai District, Nong Khai Province, Thailand) is a Thai luk thung and mor lam singer.

Early life
He was born in Nong Khai Province. His birth name is "Duangjan Malai", but he uses "Poyfai" as his stage name.

Career
He started performing on stage in 1994, as a member of mor lam band "Sieng Isan", presented by Noknoi Uraiporn. After being a member of Sieng Isan for 2–3 years, he became a solo artist. He was associated with Topline Diamond, a famous record label in Thailand, has many popular songs including Mun Tong Thon, Katoey Pra Tuang, Talok Oak Hak, etc.

He was a hard liquor consumer since he was 18 years old and couldn't work for entertainers full-time. He quit drinking in 2017 with help and encouragement from his wife.

Discography

Album
 "Poyfai Won Faen" ปอยฝ้ายวอนแฟน
 "Talok Oak Hak" ตลกอกหัก
 2002 - "Mue Sor Khon Sao" มือซอคนเศร้า
 2003 - "Nam Ta Kha Rock" น้ำตาขาร็อค
 2004 - "Won Faa" วอนฟ้า
 2005 - "Fak Faa Pai Ha Nong" ฝากฟ้าไปผ่าน้อง
 2006 - "Khao La Ma Raeng" ข่าวล่ามาแรง
 2007 - "Chatukham Khon Jon" จตุคามคนจน
 2008 - "Mun Tong Thon" มันต้องถอน
 2009 - "Mak Laew Krab" มักแล้วครับ
 2010 - "Mai Dai Aem Chan Roak" ไม่ได้แอ้มฉันหรอก
 2011 - "Hai Ai Hak Jao Sa Nor" ให้อ้ายฮักเจ้าสาเนาะ
 2012 - "Ngan Khao" งานเข้า

Single
 2015 - "Wa Si Sao Lao" ว่าสิเซาเหล้า
 2015 - "Hai Yae Nae La" ให้แหย่แหน่หล่า
 2017 - "Phee Nga Kham" ผีง่าขาม
 2018 - "Ploy Pua" ปล่อยผัว
 2018 - "Sanya Jai Num Thai Sao Lao" สัญญาใจหนุ่มไทยสาวลาว

Filmography

TV Drama
 2017 - "Nay Hoi Tha Min"
 2018 - "Nai Kuen Nao Saeng Dao Yang Oun"
 2019 - "Phoo Bao Indy Yayee Inter"

Awards
 2008 Star Entertainment Awards - Most popular luk thung song: "Mun Tong Thon"
 7th Golden Ganesha Awards - Most popular male song: "Mun Tong Thon"
 6th Maha Nakhon Awards - Most popular male Luk thung singer, and Most popular luk thung song: "Mun Tong Thon"

References

Living people
Poyfai Malaiporn
Poyfai Malaiporn
Poyfai Malaiporn
Poyfai Malaiporn
Poyfai Malaiporn
Poyfai Malaiporn
Poyfai Malaiporn
1971 births